Michal Vičan (26 March 1925 in Hlohovec – 27 January 1986 in Bratislava) was a former Slovak association football player and manager who led ŠK Slovan Bratislava to victory in the UEFA Cup Winners' Cup in the 1969 final against FC Barcelona.

As a player, he capped 10 times between 1947 and 1952 for Czechoslovakia.

References

Profile

1925 births
1986 deaths
Slovak footballers
Czechoslovak footballers
Czechoslovakia international footballers
Slovak football managers
Czechoslovak football managers
ŠK Slovan Bratislava players
ŠK Slovan Bratislava managers
Ruch Chorzów managers
Aris Thessaloniki F.C. managers
People from Hlohovec
Sportspeople from the Trnava Region
Expatriate football managers in Poland
Czechoslovak expatriate sportspeople in Poland
FK Inter Bratislava managers
Expatriate football managers in Greece
Czechoslovak expatriate sportspeople in Greece
Association football defenders